Aswat - Palestinian Feminist Center for Gender and Sexual Freedoms, also known as Aswat , is a feminist organization that advocates for lesbians and other LGBT women in the Palestinian community. The group was founded in 2003, making it the first Palestinian organization for lesbians. It was initially membership-based, but has since transitioned to a movement-based structure. It is based in Haifa.

The organization was cofounded by activist Rauda Morcos, who received the Felipe de Souza Award from OutRight Action International for her work with the group. Today, Aswat engages in advocacy work and education while also hosting monthly support group meetings that address sexual orientation, gender identity, and nationality. , its co-director was Ghadir Shafie.

History 
In October 2004, Rauda Morcos spoke at the Palestine Solidarity Movement conference at Duke University in her capacity (at the time) as the coordinator of Aswat.

On March 28, 2007, Aswat held its first public conference in a theater in Haifa. The event, titled "Home and Exile in Queer Experience," featured poetry readings and music. At least 250 people attended the conference; organizers estimated that about 10 to 20 of them were Arab lesbians. The Islamic Movement described the group as a "fatal cancer that should be forbidden from spreading out within the Arab society and from eliminating the Arab culture", and about 20 protesters demonstrated outside the event venue.

In 2011, Aswat and Al Qaws worked with activist Sarah Schulman to organize a delegation of sixteen LGBT people from the United States to Palestine. Following their visit to Israel and the Palestinian territories in early 2012, the delegation published a document titled "An Open Letter to LGBTQ Communities on the Israeli Occupation of Palestine."

See also 
 Al Qaws
 LGBT in Islam
 LGBT rights in the State of Palestine
 Pinkwashing (LGBT)

References

Further reading

External links
Official website

Lesbian feminism
LGBT organizations
LGBT in Palestine
Lesbian organizations
LGBT rights organizations
LGBT culture in the Arab world
Human rights organizations based in the State of Palestine
Queer feminism
Organizations established in 2003
Organizations based in Haifa